The Great Commoner has referred to several individuals:
 
 William Pitt the Elder, British Prime Minister, before he accepted a title as the Earl of Chatham
 William Jennings Bryan, American presidential candidate
 Winston Churchill, British Prime Minister
 Abraham Lincoln, 16th President of the United States
 Rutherford B. Hayes, 19th President of the United States
 Hara Takashi, 10th Prime Minister of Japan, popularly called "The great commoner premier"
 James Z. George, American lawyer, writer, and politician and Confederate politician and military officer called Mississippi's 'Great Commoner"
 Thaddeus Stevens, American politician
 Leon Abbett, American politician, and 26th governor of New Jersey

Great Commoner, The